Alexander Rondón Heredia (born August 30, 1977) is a Venezuelan footballer and manager who played as a striker. He played over 44 times for the Venezuela national team since his debut in 1999.

Early years 
Rondón was born in Cumaná.

Club career

Nueva Cádiz
Rondón started his playing career in 1997 with Nueva Cádiz. In 2000–01 he was part of the Caracas FC team that won the Primera División Venezolana.

Deportivo Táchira
In 2002, he joined Deportivo Táchira, he had loan spells with Estudiantes de Mérida (loan) and São Paulo of Brazil.

São Paulo 

Known as the best player of Venezuelan football, Rondón signed on loan with São Paulo in 2004, as a substitute for Luís Fabiano, who would play for Porto, in second semester of that year. He was praised for Milton Cruz, assistant coach of club, and defenders Rodrigo and Fabão, who played against him in 2004 Copa Libertadores. However, Rondón couldn't shine in Brazilian football, playing only eight matches and scoring no goals. Months later, he came back to his country.

Deportivo Anzoátegui
In 2007, he joined Deportivo Anzoátegui where he became the top scorer in the Venezuelan league for the 2007–08 season earning him a recall to the national team after a two-year absence.

Deportivo Lara/Aragua FC
In 2010, he joined Deportivo Lara, before joining Aragua FC in 2011

International career
Rondón has played for Venezuela in Copa América 1999, 2001 and 2004.

International goals

Titles

Individual awards
Primera División Venezolana topscorer: 2007–2008, 19 goals

References

External links

1977 births
Living people
People from Cumaná
Venezuelan footballers
Association football forwards
Venezuela international footballers
1999 Copa América players
2001 Copa América players
2004 Copa América players
Venezuelan Primera División players
Caracas FC players
Deportivo Táchira F.C. players
Estudiantes de Mérida players
São Paulo FC players
Deportivo Anzoátegui players
Asociación Civil Deportivo Lara players
Aragua FC players
Venezuelan expatriate footballers
Expatriate footballers in Brazil
Venezuelan expatriate sportspeople in Brazil
Zulia F.C. managers